Al-Sarawat FC  is a Saudi Arabian football (soccer) team in Al-Namas City playing at the Saudi Fourth Division.

Stadium

References

Sarawat
Football clubs in Al-Namas